Jean-Baptiste Christophe Ernest Bradfer (29 March 1833 – 9 June 1882) was a French iron master and politician who was active in local politics in Bar-le-Duc, Meuse.

Life

Ernest Bradfer was born in Nantois on 29 March 1833.
His father was Jean-Baptiste Bradfer (1808–88).
Ernest was educated in Nancy, Bar-le-Duc, Paris and then Strasbourg.
The Bradfers were both ironmasters and industrialists in Naix-aux-Forges and Bar-le-Duc.
In 1859 they partnered with the ironmaster Joseph-Bernard Viry and his son Louis to open a foundry and blast furnace in Bar-le-Duc. 
In 1866 they bought out Viry and the Bradfer-Viry company became Bradfer père et fils (Bradfer Father & Son). 
It produced iron piping for water and gas. Ernest then bought the mines in Maron, Meurthe-et-Moselle.
In 1876 they joined with  Antoine Aubin Durenne, who owned the patent for the Lavril pipe connector, and founded  "Bradfer et fils & Cie A.A. Durenne".

Ernest Bradfer was elected municipal councilor twice.
In 1879 he became mayor of Bar-le-Duc.
On 21 May 1880 he was named a Chevalier of the Legion of Honour.
Ernest Bradfer died in Bar-le-Duc in 1882.
His parents followed his wish and built a school in 1885, mainly for the children of the employees in their factories.
In 1886 a statue of Bradfer by Onésyme-Aristide Croisy was erected, surrounded by four lions.
The statue and the magnificent lions, which are each different, are in the court of the school.
A street was named after him.

Notes

Sources

1833 births
1882 deaths
French industrialists
19th-century French businesspeople
People from Meuse (department)